Potamopyrgus oppidanus  is a species of freshwater gastropod mollusk in the family Tateidae. It is endemic to New Zealand where it is found only in one area in the town belt of Wellington.

Taxonomy 
This species was first described by Martin Haase in 2008 using specimens collected in a stream in Wadestown in Wellington. The holotype specimen is held at the National Museum of New Zealand Te Papa Tongarewa.

Description 
This species is approximately 3 mm in length and just over 1 mm in width. The shell is light brown in colour and semi transparent. The colour of the mantle can be patchy and there are two black stripes on the head of the snail.

Distribution 
P. oppidanus is endemic to New Zealand and has only be found on Te Ahumairangi Hill in the town belt of Wellington. The species was first found in a fountain near Grant Road where it intersects with Wadestown Road. However the stream near the fountain was subsequently rerouted into a manmade stream bed and the snails can no longer be found there.

Habitat 
P. oppidanus lives in damp shaded areas in undisturbed leaf litter, stones and woody detritus.

Conservation status 
This species has a "Nationally Critical" conservation status under the Department of Conservation threat classification system. It has been given that status as the total area of occupancy of this species is less than 1 ha (0.01 km2) and it is only found in one location.

P. oppidanus has also been classified by the International Union for Conservation of Nature (IUCN) as critically endangered. It has a decreasing population and is only found in one location. The IUCN considers P. oppidanus as under threat from residential and commercial development, ecosystem modification, decline and fragmentation, the possibility of fire and use of fire suppressants, as well as the possibility of pollution in the freshwater habitat of the species. The IUCN recommends that the known site and the surrounding vegetation be protected and that research be undertaken into the distribution of the species as well as life history and ecology as well as threats to the species.

A recent survey of the species indicates it is declining in population. The building of illegal mountain bike tracks through its habitat is having a detrimental effect on its survival.  Tradescantia fluminensis is also contributing to this decline as the weed is smothering the snail habitat.

References

External links 

 Holotype specimen held at the Museum of New  Zealand Te Papa Tongarewa
P. oppidanus on RNZ Critter of the Week, 8 November 2016

Endangered biota of New Zealand
Gastropods of New Zealand
Gastropods described in 2008
Endemic fauna of New Zealand
Tateidae
Endemic molluscs of New Zealand